Anne Veesaar (1985-1989 Pabut, 1992-2007 Elling; born on 4 July 1957 in Valga) is an Estonian actress.

In 1980 she graduated from Tallinn State Conservatory's performing arts department. From 1980 until 1989, she worked at the Rakvere Theatre, and from 1989 until 2004, at the Vanalinnastuudio in Tallinn. From 2002 until 2004, she was the head of Vanalinnastuudio. Later, she has been a freelance actress. Besides stage roles she has also participated on films and television series.

Filmography

 1976: Minu naine sai vanaemaks (television feature film; role: Helga)
 1981: Keskpäev (television feature film)
 1993 Kapsapea (animated film; role: Roosi)  		
 1993: Väekargajad (Feature film; role: Hädi)
 1993–present Õnne 13 (television series; role: Mare Peterson)
 1997: Kapsapea 2 ehk Tagasi Euroopasse (animated film; role: Roosi)
 2000: Saamueli Internet (animated film; role: Saamuel's wife)
 2008: Tuulepealne maa (television miniseries)

References

Living people
1957 births
Estonian stage actresses
Estonian television actresses
Estonian film actresses
Estonian voice actresses
20th-century Estonian actresses
21st-century Estonian actresses
Estonian Academy of Music and Theatre alumni
People from Valga, Estonia